Corporate America is the fifth studio album by American hard rock band Boston, released in 2002. Most editions feature a live version of "Livin' for You". The original version of "Livin' for You" is from Boston's previous full-length album Walk On (1994).

The album also introduced both Anton Cosmo and Kimberley Dahme as both band members and songwriters.  This is the last Boston album to feature lead vocalist and founding member Brad Delp, during his lifetime before his death in 2007. It also marked the final appearance of Fran Cosmo.

The album sold 32,000 copies in its first week of release and charted at 42 on the Billboard 200. The album was later pulled from all digital and retail markets by founding member Tom Scholz due to a record company dispute with Artemis.

The final page of the CD booklet is dedicated to preserving the environment, providing web links to such organizations as PETA.

An instrumental song called "Crystal Love", which often was declared on the internet to be a bonus track for Corporate America, is actually a song of the South-Korean guitarist Lee Hyun Suk and appeared on his album 3 which was released in 1995.

The bonus track "Livin' for You (Live)" is on all releases of the album.

Track listing

Personnel 
Boston
 Tom Scholz – vocals (1, 3, 9), guitars (1, 3, 5, 8, 9), bass (1-5, 8, 9), drums (1, 2, 3, 5, 8, 9), keyboards (3, 5, 7-10), electric guitars (4), organ (6), lead guitar (6, 7, 10), backing vocals (6, 8), arrangements
 Brad Delp – vocals (1, 3, 5, 8), backing vocals (2), harmony vocals (10)
 Fran Cosmo – vocals (2, 3, 7), lead vocals (6, 10), rhythm guitar (10), arrangements
 Anthony Cosmo – vocals (2), guitars (2, 6), harmony vocals (6), acoustic guitar (7), rhythm guitar (7), arrangements
 Kimberley Dahme – vocals (3, 4, 9), acoustic guitar (4), harmony vocals (6), arrangements 
 Gary Pihl – keyboards (10)

Additional musicians
 Dow Brain – keyboards (2)
 Frank Talarico – keyboards (2), percussion loop (7)
 Sean Tierney – keyboards (7)
 Billy Carman – bass (6, 7)
 David Sikes – bass (10)
 Tom Moonan – drums (6, 7)
 Curly Smith – drums (10)
 Beth Cohen – flute (9), vocals (9)
 Julia Van Daam – girl voice (1)
 Bill Ryan – radio broadcast voice (3), nightstand clock (5)
 Charlie Farren – vocals (9)

Production 
 Tom Scholz – producer, engineer, art direction 
 Fran Cosmo – co-producer, engineer 
 Anthony Cosmo – co-producer, engineer 
 Dietmar Schmidt – live studio session engineer (4)
 Bob Acquaviva – drum track engineer (6, 7)
 Adam Ayan – digital transfers, editing 
 Daniel Chase – digital transfers, editing 
 Steve Churchyard – digital transfers, editing 
 Adrian Hernandez – digital transfers, editing 
 Matt Knobel – digital transfers, editing 
 Carl Nappa – digital transfers, editing 
 Gary Pihl – digital transfers, editing, image editing 
 Bill Ryan – digital transfers, editing 
 Toby Mountain – mastering 
 Alisa Andreola – design 
 Darryl Hirschler – front cover artwork 
 Darvin Atkeson – back cover artwork
 Ron Pownall – photography 
 Kathy Murry – image editing 
 John Kalodner – John Kalodner

Charts

"I Had a Good Time" peaked at #30 on the Billboard Heritage Rock Chart on November 11, 2002.

References

Boston (band) albums
2002 albums
Albums produced by Tom Scholz
Artemis Records albums